Piotr Wawrzyniak (30 January 1849 in Wyrzeka – 9 November 1910 in Poznań) was a Polish priest, economic and educational activist, patron of the Union of the Earnings and Economic Societies (Związek Spółek Zarobkowych i Gospodarczych).

References
 Witold Jakóbczyk, Przetrwać nad Wartą 1815-1914, Dzieje narodu i państwa polskiego, vol. III-55, Krajowa Agencja Wydawnicza, Warszawa 1989

1849 births
1910 deaths
People from Śrem County
19th-century Polish Roman Catholic priests
People from the Province of Posen
Polish economists
Polish cooperative organizers
Catholic clergy of the Prussian partition
Member of the Tomasz Zan Society